"One Drop" is a Japanese language song, and the ninth single, by Japanese boy band, KAT-TUN, and their third from their fourth studio album, Break the Records: By You & For You. It was released on February 11, 2009 and is the group's ninth consecutive number one single on the Oricon daily and weekly charts.

The song is sung in Japanese, but includes a few phrases sung in English, of which the title comes from the phrase "Only lonely your tear drop oh ...."

Single information
The single was released in three editions and featured alternate jacket artwork. The limited edition came with a DVD featuring the music video and a featurette on the making of the video, the first press edition included a bonus track and the regular pressing came with the instrumental versions of the songs on the single."One Drop" is also the theme song for co-lead vocalist Kazuya Kamenashi's drama, Kami no Shizuku, in which he plays the lead character whilst "D-T-S" was used as the insert song for the Lotte "Plus X" television commercials.

Chart performance
In its first week of its release, the single topped the Oricon singles chart, reportedly selling 281,359 copies. KAT-TUN gained their ninth  consecutive number one single on the Oricon Weekly Singles Chart since their debut with all their singles sold more than 200,000 copies and continued to hold the second most consecutive number one singles since debut with fellow Johnny's group, NEWS.

By the end of the year, "One Drop" was reported by Oricon to sell 331,248 copies and was later certified Platinum by RIAJ denoting over 250,000 shipments.

Track listings
 Limited edition track listing

 First press edition track listing

 Regular edition track listing

Sales and certifications

References

KAT-TUN songs
2009 singles
Oricon Weekly number-one singles
Billboard Japan Hot 100 number-one singles
Japanese television drama theme songs
2009 songs
Songs written by Koki Tanaka